The following is a list of the 287 communes of the Cher department of France.

The communes cooperate in the following intercommunalities (as of 2020):
Communauté d'agglomération Bourges Plus
Communauté de communes Arnon Boischaut Cher
Communauté de communes Berry Grand Sud
Communauté de communes Berry-Loire-Vauvise
Communauté de communes Les Bertranges (partly)
Communauté de communes Cœur de Berry
Communauté de communes du Cœur de France
Communauté de communes Le Dunois
Communauté de communes Fercher – Pays florentais
Communauté de communes Pays de Nérondes
Communauté de communes du Pays d'Issoudun (partly)
Communauté de communes Pays Fort Sancerrois Val de Loire
Communauté de communes Portes du Berry entre Loire et Val d'Aubois
Communauté de communes Sauldre et Sologne
Communauté de communes de la Septaine
Communauté de communes Terres du Haut Berry
Communauté de communes Les Trois Provinces
Communauté de communes Vierzon-Sologne-Berry

See also
 Lists of communes of France
 Administrative divisions of France

References

Lists of communes of France